Behailu Assefa (born 30 December 1989) is an Ethiopian footballer. He plays for Sebeta City and Ethiopia national football team as a midfielder.

References 

1989 births
Living people
Ethiopian footballers
Ethiopia international footballers
Association football midfielders
People from Awasa
2014 African Nations Championship players
Ethiopia A' international footballers
Saint George S.C. players
Sportspeople from Southern Nations, Nationalities, and Peoples' Region
2013 Africa Cup of Nations players
2016 African Nations Championship players